Lesley Willem Stokkers (born 1 November 1987, The Hague) is a Dutch cricketer. Having worked his way through the national youth teams, he made his debut for the Netherlands cricket team in a One Day International during Bermuda's 2008 tour of Netherlands on 8 August 2008 (which also happened to be his last), and appeared in an Intercontinental Cup game against Kenya two weeks later. He has played a total of 2 matches for the Netherlands and has scored 15 runs in total.

References

External links

1987 births
Living people
Dutch cricketers
Netherlands One Day International cricketers
Sportspeople from The Hague